Of the 4 New Hampshire incumbents, only one was re-elected.

See also 
 List of United States representatives from New Hampshire

1800
New Hampshire
United States House of Representatives